Calasanctius College, Oranmore is a co-educational secondary school catering for students between the ages of 12-19 around the County Galway town of Oranmore, and the surrounding areas, such as Carnmore, Claregalway, Clarenbridge, Kilcolgan and the south side of Galway City.

Academic
Calasanctius College operates Junior Certificate, Transition Year and Leaving Certificate courses.

History

On 23 May 1861, four Presentation Sisters from the convent in Galway established a new convent in Oranmore, at the request of Bishop John McEvilly. Their initial convent was known to the locals of Oranmore as 'the Hotel'. Not long after its establishment, an out-building of the convent was converted into an educational facility.  

In July 1869, the sisters moved into the parochial house of the then-parish priest, Father R. Quinn, which was purchased by the Presentation Order for the sum of £600. The building of the old National College began in October 1886, and three years later, a new convent was built adjoining the old parochial house.

In 1916, a hall was built on the convent grounds to provide for home economics classes for girls in the locality. This became the first secondary college, and was blessed by Michael Browne on 27 August 1946, on the feast day of St. Joseph Calasanctius.

In 1947, a boarding school for girls was opened, which continued to draw students from the surrounding areas, until the increased demand for places led to the building of a major extension in 1963.

In 1973, the college became co-educational, with the college enrolling boys for the first time. This led to the building of a new wing, incorporating a Woodwork room. From 1987 onwards the college no longer catered for boarding students, and the dormitories and refectories were converted into science laboratories and further classrooms.

In 1994, the Presentation Sisters decided to withdraw from the teaching staff, the convent was vacated and a lay college principal appointed. The college remains under the trusteeship of the Presentation Order, while being managed by laypersons.

Notable alumni
Nicola Coughlan, actress
Seán O'Brien, rugby union player
Gearóid McInerney, hurler

External links
 Calasanctius College

Buildings and structures in Galway (city)
Education in Galway (city)
Secondary schools in County Galway
1861 establishments in Ireland
Educational institutions established in 1861
Presentation Sisters schools
Catholic secondary schools in the Republic of Ireland